A projector phone is a mobile phone that contains a built-in pico projector.

List of projector phones

See also
List of 3D-enabled mobile phones
List of NFC-enabled mobile devices

References

5 Best Projector Phones For Presenters

Projectors
Emerging technologies